NBA Tonight is a National Basketball Association studio program that airs on ESPN. The program used to air as part of ESPN's The Trifecta. Formerly known as NBA 2Night and NBA Fastbreak, the program, hosted by various ESPN personalities, provides highlights, analysis and updates from the night's NBA games. Segments include "3Ds", which looks at the night's top dunks, defense and dimes (assists).

Personalities

Current
Jon Barry (analyst, 2006–present)
Bruce Bowen (analyst)
Brad Daugherty (analyst)
Tim Legler (analyst)
Jalen Rose (analyst)
Marc Stein (analyst)
Kevin Connors (host)
Jonathan Coachman (host)
Cassidy Hubbarth (host)

Former
Greg Anthony (analyst)
B. J. Armstrong (analyst)
Chris Broussard (reporter)
Dee Brown (analyst)
Ric Bucher (reporter)
Swin Cash (analyst)
Sean Elliott (analyst)
Robert Flores (host)
Kevin Frazier (host)
Allan Houston (analyst)
Mark Jackson (analyst)
Nancy Lieberman (analyst)
Jamal Mashburn (analyst)
Paul Silas (analyst)
Jason Jackson (host)
Mark Morgan (host)
Matt Winer (host)
Fred Carter (analyst)

See also
NBA Shootaround
NBA Friday Coast to Coast
NBA Wednesday

References
ESPNtv.com - NBA Fastbreak
ESPN GETS A RE-PHIL

ESPN original programming
2002 American television series debuts
2010s American television series
2020s American television series
American sports television series
Fastbreak